Barnowo is a non-operational PKP railway station in Barnowo (Pomeranian Voivodeship), Poland.

Lines crossing the station

References 
Barnowo article at Polish Stations Database, URL accessed at 29 March 2006

External links
Barcino at Google Local

Railway stations in Pomeranian Voivodeship
Disused railway stations in Pomeranian Voivodeship
Bytów County